Garfield Township is a township in Pocahontas County, Iowa, USA.

History
Garfield Township was created from land given by Clinton Township in 1903.

References

Townships in Pocahontas County, Iowa
Townships in Iowa